Zinc finger protein 676 is a protein in humans that is encoded by the ZNF676 gene.

References

Further reading 

Genes on human chromosome 19